Grumia is a subgenus of moths of the genus Isochlora of the family Noctuidae.

References
Natural History Museum Lepidoptera genus database

Noctuinae
Insect subgenera